Ernest Augustus Edgcumbe, 3rd Earl of Mount Edgcumbe (23 March 1797 – 3 September 1861), styled Viscount Valletort between 1818 and 1837, was a British peer and politician.

Background
Mount Edgcumbe was the second but eldest surviving son of Richard Edgcumbe, 2nd Earl of Mount Edgcumbe, and Lady Sophia, daughter of John Hobart, 2nd Earl of Buckinghamshire. He gained the courtesy title Viscount Valletort on the death of his elder brother, William Edgcumbe, Viscount Valletort, in 1818.

Political career
Mount Edgcumbe was returned to Parliament for Fowey in 1819 (succeeding his deceased elder brother Lord Valletort), a seat he held until 1826, and then represented Lostwithiel until 1830. In 1837 he succeeded his father in the earldom and entered the House of Lords.

Family
Lord Mount Edgcumbe married Caroline Augusta, daughter of Rear-Admiral Charles Feilding, in 1831. She was a half-sister of Henry Fox Talbot. He died in September 1861, aged 64, and was succeeded in the earldom by his son, William. Lady Mount Edgcumbe survived him by 20 years and died in November 1881.

References

External links

1797 births
1861 deaths
3
Valletort, Ernest Edgcumbe, Viscount
Valletort, Ernest Edgcumbe, Viscount
Valletort, Ernest Edgcumbe, Viscount
Valletort, Ernest Edgcumbe, Viscount
Valletort, Ernest Edgcumbe, Viscount
Valletort, Ernest Edgcumbe, Viscount
UK MPs who inherited peerages